Eric Newman (24 November 1924 — January 1971) was an English footballer who played as a goalkeeper.

Career
Newman began his career playing for non-league clubs Whitton United and Romford. In 1945, Newman signed for Ipswich Town, before leaving to join Arsenal in October 1946. On 8 September 1950, Newman re-signed for Ipswich, making 18 Football League appearances in three years at the club. Following his second spell with Ipswich, Newman signed for Chelmsford City.

References

1924 births
1971 deaths
Association football goalkeepers
English footballers
Footballers from Romford
Whitton United F.C. players
Romford F.C. players
Ipswich Town F.C. players
Arsenal F.C. players
Chelmsford City F.C. players
English Football League players